Horst Krautzig (born 6 June 1952, in Germany) is a retired German footballer who played as a midfielder.

External links
 

1952 births
Living people
German footballers
Association football midfielders
FC Energie Cottbus players
1. FC Frankfurt players